NORDSEE is a German fast-food restaurant chain specialising in seafood. In addition to selling raw and smoked seafood, the company also sells a wide variety of meals and products prepared from seafood such as Fischbrötchen (fish sandwiches), salads, and canned seafood. The company formerly supplied its own seafood but has since sold the fishery.

History

Nordsee was founded in 1896 as "German steam-fishery company Nordsee" to supply seafood from the North Sea to the residents of Bremen. In 1964 the company opened restaurant type retail shops offering meals prepared from seafood in addition to raw seafood. This concept, known as Nordsee Quick, was a huge success as nearly 300 shops opened within 2 years. In 1998, the company sold the fishery division known as Deutsche See to allow for more focus towards seafood retailing. The new focus was demonstrated with the introduction of locations serving smaller, quicker takeout meals in the following year.

In 2005 the company was sold to Kamps Food Retail Investments and Nomura International. The company underwent restructuring and experienced a growth in profits five times greater than expected in the first year. In response to a new emerging market, the company introduced sushi and a number of other higher quality food products the following year and has begun to move into other sectors of the food industry with success.

In October 2018, Nordsee was sold to Swiss investment fund Kharis Capital.

Operations
Nordsee restaurants are usually located in populated areas such as city centers or near airports and train stations. The company focuses primarily on Germany and Austria but operates additional locations in the Czech Republic, Romania, Slovakia, Switzerland, Hungary, and more recently, Cyprus, United Arab Emirates, Egypt, Bulgaria, Turkey and Russia. The company also operates in Belgium with another commercial name “Happy Fish”. In 2016, Nordsee achieved a revenue of over 350 million euros. As of 2020, there are 370 Nordsee franchises operating in Europe and the Middle East.

See also
 List of seafood restaurants

References

External links

 

Companies based in Bremerhaven
Restaurants established in 1896
Fast-food seafood restaurants
Fast-food chains of Germany
1896 establishments in Germany